Mali-Koa Hood, often credited as Mali-Koa, is an Australian singer and songwriter based in London, United Kingdom. She is the daughter of Joy and David Hood and the older sister of singer, songwriter and 5 Seconds of Summer's bassist, Calum Hood.

History 
In April 2012, at the age of 20, Hood competed in the first season of the singing competition series, The Voice Australia. She covered          "American Boy" for her blind audition and did a duet cover of "What's Up?" before being eliminated in the battle rounds portion of the show.

On 22 December 2017, Hood released her debut solo song and promotional single, "Honest". The song received over 2 million streams. In March 2018, Hood announced that she had signed a record deal with Island Records UK and revealed that she would be releasing an album.

On 26 July 2018, Hood was featured on a remix of JP Cooper's song "All This Love". The song received national radio play and was later featured on the fifth season of the British reality series, Love Island. As of July 2020, the song's official music video has received over 15 million views on Youtube and over 9 million streams on Spotify.

On 7 December 2018, Hood released "Pretend", her first song released via Island Records. In May 2019, Hood performed at The Great Escape festival in London. On 31 May 2019, Hood released a song titled "Sorry" with the track's accompanying music video being released on 12 June. The song's official music video has since received 2.5 million views on Youtube.

In March 2020, Hood performed at the Global APRA Music Awards in London. On 22 April 2020, Hood released "Dancer", the first single from her upcoming album, set for release later in the year. The song's accompanying music video was released the same day. On 4 June 2020, Hood released the album's second single, titled "Some Things", premiering the song on Atwood Magazine. On 9 July 2020. Hood released the album's third single, "Me Before You". The song's music video was released on 29 July 2020. In August 2020, the singer-songwriter released a cover of Robin S's "Show Me Love"  and in February 2021, a cover of the song "You're the Voice" by the Australian icon John Farnham.

Apart from releasing songs, Mali-Koa has also written songs for other artists, including G-Eazy and Sigma.

She is part of a project called AR/CO  with fellow musician Leo Stannard,.

Discography

Studio albums

Singles

Song credits

Awards

References

External links 
 

1991 births
Living people
21st-century Australian women singers
Australian people of Māori descent
Singers from Sydney